Salvia prionitis is an annual herb that is native to Anhui, Guangdong, Guangxi, Hunan, Jiangxi, and Zhejiang provinces in China, found growing on hillsides and grassy places at  elevation. Inflorescences are widely spaced 6-14 flowered verticillasters in racemes or panicles, with a violet corolla.

Notes

prionitis
Flora of China